Ayre is one of the six sheadings of the Isle of Man.

It is located in the north of the island (part of the traditional North Side division) and consists of the three historic parishes of Andreas, Bride and (Kirk Christ) Lezayre.

The town of Ramsey, which is administered separately, covers areas of two historic parishes (Lezayre, and Maughold in the sheading of Garff). It is treated as part of Garff for some purposes, e.g. the coroner.

Other settlements in the sheading include Glen Auldyn and Sulby (both in the parish of Lezayre).

Etymology
The derivation of the word ayre is from Old Norse "eyrr", meaning a shingle beach. It refers to a storm beach forming a narrow spit of shingle or sand cutting across the landward and seaward ends of a shallow bay. This may partly cut off a sheltered stretch of water from the sea to form a shallow freshwater loch. This word is still in use for the particular landform in the Northern Isles of Scotland.

MHKs and elections
Before the 2016 elections, Ayre was one of the House of Keys constituencies. It is now part of the Ayre & Michael constituency.

See also
Local government in the Isle of Man

References

External links
Constituency maps and general election results

Sheadings of the Isle of Man
Constituencies of the Isle of Man